Amara convexiuscula is a species of ground beetle native to Europe and Asia.

References

Further reading

 

convexiuscula
Beetles described in 1796
Beetles of Europe